Jefferson and/or Mussolini: L'Idea Statale Fascism as I Have Seen It is a book by the American ex-patriate poet and fascist collaborator Ezra Pound. It was first published in 1935 by Stanley Nott Ltd in London.

The book compares Benito Mussolini, then Prime Minister of Italy and leader of the National Fascist Party, to Thomas Jefferson, third President of the United States. Pound, who lived from 1924 in Rapallo, Italy, wrote the book shortly after meeting Mussolini on 30 January 1933. His agent had the manuscript by the end of February.

Pound argues that "[t]he fundamental likenesses between these two men are probably greater than their difference." In fact, most of the book is about Mussolini and devoted to his defence. Pound had trouble finding a publisher. In the book's front matter he writes:

References

Works cited
 Moody, A. David (2014). Ezra Pound: Poet. A Portrait of the Man and His Work. II: The Epic Years 1921–1939. Oxford: Oxford University Press. 
 Pound, Ezra (1970) [1935]. Jefferson and/or Mussolini. New York: Liverright.
 Redman, Tim (1991). Ezra Pound and Italian Fascism. Cambridge: Cambridge University Press. 

1935 non-fiction books
Works by Ezra Pound
Cultural depictions of Benito Mussolini